Michel Magras (born 6 January 1954) is a member of the Senate of France, representing the island of Saint Barthélemy.  He is a member of the Union for a Popular Movement. His brother Bruno Magras is Saint Barthélemy's current President of the Territorial Council of Saint Barthélemy and owns the St Barth Commuter local airline.

References
Page on the Senate website

1954 births
Living people
Saint Barthélemy politicians
Union for a Popular Movement politicians
French Senators of the Fifth Republic
Senators of Saint Barthélemy